HMS Berwick  was one of 10  armoured cruisers built for the Royal Navy in the first decade of the 20th century. She was assigned to the 2nd Cruiser Squadron of the Channel Fleet upon completion in 1903 and was transferred to the Home Fleet in 1906. She accidentally rammed and sank a British destroyer in 1908. Berwick was refitted in 1908–09 before she was transferred to the 4th Cruiser Squadron on the North America and West Indies Station later that year.

She captured a German merchant ship shortly after World War I began. The ship patrolled for German commerce raiders and escorted convoys for the war. Berwick was assigned to the 8th Light Cruiser Squadron in 1919 before she was paid off and sold for scrap in 1920.

Design and description
The ships were designed to displace . They were powered by two 4-cylinder triple-expansion steam engines, each driving one shaft using steam provided by 31 Belleville boilers.

The Monmouth-class ships' main armament consisted of fourteen breech-loading (BL)  Mk VII guns. Four of these guns were mounted in two twin-gun turrets, one each fore and aft of the superstructure, and the others were positioned in casemates amidships. Six of these were mounted on the main deck and were only usable in calm weather. Ten quick-firing (QF) 12-pounder 12-cwt guns were fitted for defence against torpedo boats. Berwick also carried three 3-pounder  Hotchkiss guns and two submerged 18-inch (450 mm) torpedo tubes.

Beginning in 1915, the main deck six-inch guns of the Monmouth-class ships were moved to the upper deck and given gun shields. Their casemates were plated over to improve seakeeping. The twelve-pounder guns displaced by the transfer were repositioned elsewhere. At some point in the war, a pair of three-pounder anti-aircraft guns were installed on the upper deck, although Berwick had hers removed before the end of the war. 
 
The armour of the gun turrets, their barbettes and the casemates was four inches thick.

Construction and service

Berwick, named for the Scottish county, was laid down by Beardmore at their shipyard in Dalmuir on 19 April 1901 and launched on 20 September 1902 when she was named by Lady Houstoun-Boswall. She was completed on 9 December 1903 and was initially assigned to the 2nd Cruiser Squadron of the Channel Fleet. She was transferred to the Home Fleet in March 1906. On 2 April 1908, she accidentally collided with the destroyer  when the destroyer crossed Berwicks bows during a night exercise in the English Channel, south of the Isle of Wight. Tiger was sliced in two and sank with the loss of 36 lives. After a refit at Portsmouth Royal Dockyard that ended in April 1909, she was assigned to the 4th Cruiser Squadron on the North America and West Indies Station.

She was still there when World War I began in August 1914 and captured a German merchant ship, SS Spreewald, on 10 September. She patrolled for German raiders and escorted convoys for the rest of the war. Berwick was assigned to the 8th Light Cruiser Squadron in 1919 before she was sold for scrap on 1 July 1920. The ship was eventually broken up in 1922 in Germany.

Notes

Footnotes

Bibliography

External links

 

Monmouth-class cruisers
Ships built on the River Clyde
1902 ships
Maritime incidents in 1908
World War I cruisers of the United Kingdom